Eremochroa alphitias is a moth of the family Noctuidae. It is found in the Australian Capital Territory, New South Wales, the Northern Territory, Queensland, South Australia and Victoria.

The wingspan is about 20 mm. Adults have pale brown patterned forewings and even paler hindwings.

External links
Australian Faunal Directory
Australian Insects 

Moths of Australia
Hadeninae
Moths described in 1897
Taxa named by Edward Meyrick